Puotinharju (Finnish), Botbyhöjden (Swedish) is an eastern neighborhood of Helsinki, Finland.

Neighbourhoods of Helsinki